National Electoral Commission may refer to:

National Electoral Commission (Angola)
National Electoral Commission (Cape Verde)
National Electoral Commission (Chad)
National Electoral Commission (East Timor)
National Electoral Commission (Poland)
National Electoral Commission (Rwanda)
National Electoral Commission (Tanzania)
National Electoral Commission (Somaliland)